Sowhan (also Romanized as Sowhān and Sūhān) is a village in Pain Taleqan Rural District, in the Central District of Taleqan County, Alborz Province, Iran. At the 2006 census, its population was 775, in 212 families.

References 

see more information about Souhan village - www.zeinali.ir/en-souhan.htm www.zeinali.ir/en-souhan.htm

Populated places in Taleqan County